Silverwing is a 2003 animated television series based on Kenneth Oppel's novel of the same name. It has 2D and 3D animation hybrid.

Synopsis
Years before the migration, the animals started the Great Battle for the balance of nature and territories to all species. The bats were exiled from choosing sides, so Shade sets out on a journey to reason them.

Characters

Bats
Shade: (Bill Switzer) A travelling Silverwing bat separated from the colony.  
Marina: (Sharon Alexander) An exiled Brightwing bat whom Shade befriended.
Goth: (Michael Dobson) A cannibal bat. He and Throbb escape the laboratory.
Throbb: (Richard Newman) Goth's brother in-law.
Frieda: (Pam Hyatt) The banded chief elder of the colony.
Bathsheba: (Shirley Millner) A selfish member of the Silverwing elders. She later betrays the colony.
Ariel: (Randall Carpenter) Shade's mother whose mate, Cassiel left the colony.
Mercury: (Ian James Corlett) Frieda's loyal guardian and the leader of female bats.
Chinook: (Matt Hill) One of Shade's friends.
Zephyr: (Richard Newman) A blind albino bat living in the cathedral spire.
Scirocco: (Ian James Corlett) The charismatic shapeshifting leader for the colony of banded bats in the mountain cabin.
Penelope: (Randall Carpenter) One of the banded bats, whom Shade rescued.
Hector: (Lee Tockar) Chinook's father and one of the Silverwing elders. He reunites with the colony at Hibernaculum.
Breeze: (Stevie Vallance) One of Shade's friends.

Others
Brutus: (Richard Newman) The leader of the owls. He later renounces the war.
Orestes: (Richard Ian Cox) Brutus' son. He later helps the bats redeem other animals.
Atlas: (Michael Dobson) Brutus' owl assistant.
Ursa: (Candus Churchill) The Kermode bear who later becomes the leader of beasts opposing the wolves.
Luger: (Lee Tockar) The leader of the wolves whom Goth recruited.
Remus: (Richard Ian Cox) The selfish king of the rats and Romulus' brother.
Romulus: (Lee Tockar) Remus' brother. He later replaces the latter as king.

Differences from the novel
 In the novel, Orestes is King Boreal's son, but is changed for Brutus for the series.
 In the novel, Throbb dies in a thunderstorm, but he survives throughout the series.
 In Sunwing, King Boreal forgives the colony of bats. In the series, Brutus does the same thing.
 In the novel, Throbb is Goth's traveling companion, but they are brothers-in-law in the series.
 In the novel, the beasts do not become embroiled in the owl-bat conflict, except in the series.
 Shade cannot echo project in the novel, but makes a similar ability in Sunwing.
 Marina keeps her band throughout the series, whereas it is removed near the end of the novel.

Episodes
Note: The episodes were released in the miniseries format as three television films, with new endings created for the first two parts. They included A Glimpse of the Sun, Towers of Fire and Redemption.

Production
The series was produced by Bardel Entertainment, with additional work done by the Philippine Animation Studio. It was originally distributed by Bardel and B Wooding Media.

Early plans as of 2001 consisted of a theatrical movie with a budget of US$25–30 million to be co-produced with the UK's Melwood Pictures, followed by a US$5 million TV series developed with participation from an unspecified American broadcaster.

A second season of 13 episodes was announced to be in development in 2003, along with an online video game website with 13 levels to match the episodes. The website had over 20 games available by mid-2004, while the planned season was quietly shelved later that year.

Release

Broadcast
Silverwing was commissioned by and first aired on Teletoon in Canada in fall 2003.

In the United States, the series was shown on Toon Disney's Jetix block in autumn 2005, with Jetix later airing the show internationally.

Home media
The full series has been released on DVD in the US and the UK.

Reception
Silverwing has had mostly positive reception.

Animation Magazine ran a six-part series about the show in 2003, viewing it as "a grand miniseries" that "really raises the bar in TV animation". Common Sense Media described Silverwing as a "great kids' series" and gave it 4 out of 5 stars, adding however that its "complex, political story themes" may present difficulties for younger children.

An encyclopedic review considered the series to be relatively accurate to the text, despite minor changes. "The program conducted its affairs well without stumbling and therefore stands as a high point in the often creatively checkered world of Canadian television animation."

In contrast, one reviewer found the show to have poor animation and significant differences from the source material, particularly in terms of darker elements, while only praising the voice acting as "fantastic".

Awards and nominations

References

External links

Canadian children's animated action television series
Canadian children's animated adventure television series
Canadian children's animated fantasy television series
Canadian flash animated television series
Funimation
Silverwing (series)
Jetix original programming
Canadian television shows based on children's books
2003 Canadian television series debuts
2003 Canadian television series endings
Teletoon original programming
2000s Canadian animated television series
Animated television series about mammals
Animated television series about bears
Animated television series about mice and rats
Television series about wolves
Television shows about death